John or Jock Hutcheson may refer to:

Jock Hutcheson (fl. 1880s), Scottish footballer
John Conroy Hutcheson (1840–1897), British 19th century writer, author of nautical fiction books
John Hutcheson (1853–1940), Scottish-New Zealand politician
John Hutcheson (footballer) (1909–1979), Scottish footballer (Falkirk, Chelsea)

See also
John Hutchison (disambiguation)
John Hutchinson (disambiguation)